Len Garrett is a former tight end in the National Football League.

Biography
Garrett was born Leonard Neal Garrett on December 18, 1947 in Silsbee, Texas.

Career
Garrett was drafted by the Green Bay Packers in the fifteenth round of the 1971 NFL Draft. He played two seasons with the team before splitting the 1973 NFL season with the Packers and the New Orleans Saints. Garrett was a member of the Saints the following season and part of the 1975 NFL season before playing the rest of his season with the San Francisco 49ers.

He played at the collegiate level at New Mexico Highlands University.

See also
List of Green Bay Packers players
List of New Orleans Saints players

References

1947 births
Living people
People from Silsbee, Texas
Green Bay Packers players
New Orleans Saints players
San Francisco 49ers players
American football tight ends
New Mexico Highlands Cowboys football players
Players of American football from Texas